The Soviet order of battle for the invasion of Poland in 1939 details the major combat units arrayed for the Soviet surprise attack on Poland on September 17, 1939. As a result of joining battle after the Germans had already launched their invasion, the Soviets, prepared for battle in secrecy, met comparatively limited resistance. Several skirmishes between the German and Soviet forces did occur, but neither government was prepared for starting a larger conflict, and these were soon referred to as "misunderstandings".

Like the Germans, the Soviets employed two primary offensive axes, each managed by a Front. Each Front commander had at his disposal a mobile group of forces created from cavalry and mechanised troops; a precursor of the cavalry-mechanised groups of the Second World War.

The effects of the purge are visible in the ranks of the commanders in the order of battle, with only one Army commander serving in the appropriate rank of Komandarm, in this case 2nd Class (Komandarm 2nd rank), the rest serving in being Corps (Komcor) and Divisional (Komdiv) Commander rank

Belorussian Front
Komandarm 2nd rank Mikhail Kovalyov

Third Army
Komkor Vasily Kuznetsov
 4th Rifle Corps
 27th Rifle Division
 50th Rifle Division
 Lepelska Group
 5th Rifle Division
 24th Cavalry Division
 22nd Tank Brigade
 25th Tank Brigade

Eleventh Army
Komdiv Nikifor Medvedev
 16th Rifle Corps
 2nd Rifle Division
 100th Rifle Division
 3rd Cavalry Corps
 7th Cavalry Division
 36th Cavalry Division
 6th Tank Brigade

Cavalry-mechanised Group
Komkor Ivan Boldin
 5th Rifle Corps
 4th Rifle Division
 13th Rifle Division
 6th Cavalry Corps
 4th Cavalry Division
 6th Cavalry Division
 11th Cavalry Division
 15th Tank Corps
 2nd Tank Brigade
 21st Tank Brigade
 27th Tank Brigade
 20th Motorised Rifle Brigade

 Tenth Army
 Komkor Ivan Zakharkin
 11th Corps
 6th Rifle Division
 33rd Rifle Division
 121st Rifle Division

 Fourth Army
 Komdiv Vasily Chuikov
 8th Rifle Division
 29th Tank Brigade
 32nd Tank Brigade
 23rd Rifle Corps
 52nd Rifle Division
 Dnieper Flotilla

Ukrainian Front
Covered southern sector of Polish front
Komandarm 1st rank Semyon Timoshenko
Chief of Staff Kombrig Nikolai Vatutin

Shepetovka Army Group
Komdiv Ivan Sovetnikov
 15th Rifle Corps
 45th Rifle Division
 60th Rifle Division
 87th Rifle Division
 8th Rifle Corps
 44th Rifle Division
 81st Rifle Division
 36th Light-Tank Brigade

Volochysk Army Group
Komkor Filipp Golikov
 2nd Cavalry Corps
 3rd Cavalry Division
 5th Cavalry Division
 14th Cavalry Division
 24th Light Tank Brigade
 17th Rifle Corps
 96th Rifle Division
 97th Rifle Division
 10th Heavy-Tank Brigade
 38th Light-Tank Brigade

Kamienets-Podolsky Army Group
Komandarm Ivan Tyulenev
 13th Rifle Corps
 72nd Rifle Division
 99th Rifle Division

 Front Cavalry Group
 4th Cavalry Corps
 32nd Cavalry Division
 34th Cavalry Division
 26th Independent Light-Tank Brigade
 5th Cavalry Corps
 9th Cavalry Division
 16th Cavalry Division
 23rd Independent Light-Tank Brigade

 25th Tank Corps
 4th Light-Tank Brigade
 5th Light-Tank Brigade
 1st Motor Rifle Brigade

See also 
 War and campaign articles
 World War II
 Invasion of Poland
 Other forces in the Polish Campaign
 German order of battle for Operation Fall Weiss
 Polish army order of battle in 1939

Notes

References

Sources
 Meltyukhov M.I., Soviet-Polish wars. Military-political confrontation 1918-1939, Moscow, Veche, 2001.

Soviet invasion of Poland
World War II orders of battle